Uši is the sixth studio album by Czech progressive rock band Už jsme doma. It was released in 1999 via Skoda Records.

The record was somewhat of an American breakthrough for the band and also marked the first time that they had worked with an American producer. A 2000 tour in support of the album coincided with the band's fifteenth anniversary.

Production
Uši was produced by Dan Rathburn, of the band Idiot Flesh.

Critical reception
Francois Couture, in an AllMusic review, wrote that producer "Dan Rathbun captured the band members' live energy while allowing them an ample sound for their more symphonic inclinations." CMJ New Music Monthly stated that "a studied roughness continues to creep into the kinetic art-rock/jazz/ethnic/punk/chamber pop fusion theorized by key personnel Miroslav Wanek and Jindra Dolansky."

The San Diego Union-Tribune wrote that the album "features noodling guitars ("Oko"), thick bass riffs ("Bosi") and epic jams (Usi") —all of which the band delivers with its own distinct style." The Province opined that "the band rocks like almost no other artist since Frank Zappa or Soft Machine."

Track listing

References

1999 albums
Progressive rock albums by Czech artists